Hilliard Lyle (December 21, 1879 – May 21, 1931) was a Canadian lacrosse player who competed in the 1904 Summer Olympics. Lyle was born in Arran-Elderslie, Ontario. In 1904 he was member of the Shamrock Lacrosse Team which won the gold medal in the lacrosse tournament.

References

External links
 Hilliard Lyle's profile at databaseOlympics
 

1879 births
1931 deaths
Canadian lacrosse players
Lacrosse players at the 1904 Summer Olympics
Olympic gold medalists for Canada
Olympic lacrosse players of Canada
Medalists at the 1904 Summer Olympics
Olympic medalists in lacrosse